The  took place at the New National Theater in Tokyo on December 30, 2015. The ceremony was televised in Japan on TBS.

Presenters 
 Shin'ichirō Azumi (TBS announcer)
 Yukie Nakama

Winners and winning works

Grand Prix 
 Sandaime J Soul Brothers from Exile Tribe — "Unfair World"

Best Singer Award 
 Seiko Matsuda

Best New Artist Award 
 Magnolia Factory

Excellent Work Award 
 AAA — "Aishiteru no ni, Aisenai"
 Mariya Nishiuchi — "Arigatou Forever..."
 Sandaime J Soul Brothers from Exile Tribe — "Unfair World"
 Kiyoshi Hikawa — "Itoshi no Tekīro"
 Hiroshi Miyama — "Oiwaki Yama"
 Kana Nishino — "Torisetsu"
 AKB48 — "Bokutachi wa Tatakawanai"
 Kyary Pamyu Pamyu — "Mondai Girl"
 Kaori Mizumori — "Yamatoji no Koi"
 Gesu no Kiwami Otome — "Watashi Igai Watashi Ja Nai no"

New Artist Award 
 lol
 Magnolia Factory
 Natsumi Hanaoka
 Rei Yasuda

Best Album Award 
 Southern All Stars — "Budou"

Excellence Album Award 
 Sekai no Owari — "Tree"
 Taeko Onuki and Ryōta Komatsu — "Tint"
 Kenshi Yonezu — "Bremen"
 Tube — "Your TUBE+My TUBE"

Good Planning Award 
 Hideaki Tokunaga — "VOCALIST 1-6"
 ACOON HIBINO — "Kokoro to Karada o Totonoeru: Ai no Shūhasū 528Hz", "Jiritsu Shinkei o Totonoeru Oto no Shohousen: Ai no Shūhasū 528Hz"
 Takamiy, Takeshi Tsuruno, Daigo, Mamoru Miyano, The Alfee, Voyager — "Takamizawa Toshihiko Produce Ultra Hero Song Retsuden"
 Takako Tokiwa, Yaeko Mizutani, Yōko Minamino, Yoshie Taira, Ruriko Asaoka, Kaori Momoi, Pinko Izumi, Yoshiko Sakuma, Reiko Takashima, Mitsuko Kusabue, Shinobu Otake, Tetsuko Kuroyanagi — "Rei Nakanishi to 12-nin no Joyū Tachi"
 Chitose Hajime — "Shōwa Gannen"
 "Takashi Matsumoto Sakushi Katsudō 45-Shūnen Tribute Kazemachi de Aimashou"
 Wagakki Band — Yasou Emaki
 Juju — "Request", "Request II"
 Saya Asakura — "River Boat Song: Future Trax"

Achievement Award 
 Hiroyuki Itsuki
 Shunsuke Kikuchi
 Asei Kobayashi
 Akira Fuse
 Kenichi Mikawa

Special Achievement Award 
 Isao Etō
 Kunihiko Kase
 Yasunori Sugahara
 Michiyasu Tadano
 Tetsuya Chiaki
 Daisuke Mishima

Encouragement Award by Japan Composer's Association 
 Sayuri Ishikawa
 Keisuke Yamauchi

Special Award 
 "Attakain Dakarā♪" (Kumamushi's song)
 Masaharu Fukuyama

Best Composer Award 
 Tsunku — "Umarete Kite Kurete Arigatou" (sung by Kumiko)

Best Songwriter Award 
 Makoto Kitajō — "Spotlight" (Keisuke Yamauchi's song), "Yokohama no Odoriko" (Daisuke Kitagawa's song)

Best Arranger Award 
 Seiji Kameda — "Anata" (Ikimono-gakari's song), "Hitomi" (Sakurako Ohara's song)

References

External links
 

2015
Japan Record Awards
Japan Record Awards
Japan Record Awards
Japan Record Awards